Daniel Eliot (1646–1702) of Port Eliot, St Germans, Cornwall was a British politician who served as Member of Parliament for St Germans from 1679 until 1700 and April to December 1701.

Born at Port Eliot in 1646, he was the son of John Eliot and Honora Norton. His younger brother Richard (1652–1685) was also a member of parliament for St Germans. Eliot attended Christ's College at Cambridge. Following his father's death in 1685 he inherited Port Eliot and married Katherine Fleming. They had a daughter Katherine (died 1724) who married Browne Willis in 1707.

He left Port Eliot to his cousin Edward Eliot, MP.

References

1646 births
1702 deaths
People from St Germans, Cornwall
Alumni of Christ's College, Cambridge
Members of the pre-1707 English Parliament for constituencies in Cornwall
English MPs 1679
English MPs 1685–1687
English MPs 1689–1690
English MPs 1690–1695
English MPs 1695–1698
English MPs 1698–1700
English MPs 1701–1702
Daniel